William Fraser Sutherland (November 10, 1934 – April 9, 2017) was a Canadian professional ice hockey centre and a National Hockey League (NHL) coach. He played in the NHL for five teams between 1963 and 1972, and then in the World Hockey Association with the Winnipeg Jets between 1972 and 1974. After his playing career he briefly coached the Jets between 1980 and 1981. He scored the first goal in Philadelphia Flyers history in 1967 in a 1–0 victory over the Pittsburgh Penguins.

Playing career

Minor league career
Sutherland played two seasons with the St. Boniface Canadiens of the Manitoba Junior Hockey League, scoring 60 points in 25 games during the 1954–55 season. He then embarked on a long minor league career, serving stints with the Cincinnati Mohawks, Montreal Royals, Cleveland Barons, and Quebec Aces. He made his NHL debut in 1963, playing two playoff games after a series of injuries to the Montreal Canadiens forward unit.

NHL
The 1967 expansion gave Sutherland a chance to finally break into hockey's top league, as the Philadelphia Flyers purchased the Aces as their new top farm team and transferred Quebec's best players to the NHL squad. He scored the first goal in Flyers history on October 11, 1967. He became the first player in NHL history to score the first NHL goal in two arenas in the same season. He scored the first goal at the Long Beach Sports Arena in a 4–2 loss to the Los Angeles Kings. Five days later he scored the only goal in a 1–0 victory against the Pittsburgh Penguins at the first game at the Philadelphia Spectrum.

The next season, the Minnesota North Stars selected Sutherland in the intra-league draft. However, he never played for this franchise, and instead was dealt to the Toronto Maple Leafs. After 44 games with Toronto, he was traded back to the Flyers. He spent the next year as a Flyers starter, and he then scored an NHL career-high 39 points in 1970–71 with the St. Louis Blues. The next year, he saw limited playing time with the Blues and the Detroit Red Wings. He ended his playing career with the Winnipeg Jets during their World Hockey Association days.

Coaching career
After retirement, Sutherland was involved with sports broadcasting until his hiring by the Jets as an assistant coach in 1979. After the firing of Tom McVie with three games left in the 1979–80 season, Sutherland became head coach. However, he was fired 29 games into the next season.

Death
Sutherland died on April 9, 2017, at the age of 82.

Career statistics

Regular season and playoffs

Head coaching record

Awards
 MJHL Second Team All-Star (1955)
 IHL goal scoring leader (1958)
 IHL Second All-Star Team (1958)
 Honoured Member of the Manitoba Hockey Hall of Fame

References

External links
 
 Profile at Flyers History
 Bill Sutherland's biography at Manitoba Hockey Hall of Fame

1934 births
2017 deaths
Canadian ice hockey centres
Canadian ice hockey coaches
Cincinnati Mohawks (IHL) players
Cleveland Barons (1937–1973) players
Detroit Red Wings players
Ice hockey people from Saskatchewan
Montreal Canadiens players
Montreal Royals (EPHL) players
Montreal Royals (QSHL) players
Philadelphia Flyers players
Quebec Aces (AHL) players
Rochester Americans players
Shawinigan-Falls Cataracts (QSHL) players
Sportspeople from Regina, Saskatchewan
St. Boniface Canadiens players
St. Louis Blues players
Tidewater Wings players
Toronto Maple Leafs players
Winnipeg Jets (1972–1996) coaches
Winnipeg Jets (WHA) players